X49 or X-49 may refer to:

 X49, airport code for South Lakeland Airport
 X-49, a fictional robot assassin in the animated series Samurai Jack
 Piasecki X-49 "Speedhawk", an experimental compound helicopter